The Green River Presbyterian Church, also known as Green River Bible Church, is a historic Presbyterian church at 134 W. Third Avenue in Green River, Utah.  The Late Gothic Revival building was constructed in 1906. The building was added to the National Register of Historic Places in 1989.

Description
It was deemed architecturally significant at the local level as an excellent example of the Victorian Gothic style. It is also historically significant as the first church built in the town and as an important early example of the "community church" phase of Protestant church activity in Utah that was then predominantly inhabited by members of The Church of Jesus Christ of Latter-day Saints.

See also

 National Register of Historic Places listings in Emery County, Utah

References

External links

 

Buildings and structures in Emery County, Utah
Carpenter Gothic church buildings in Utah
Presbyterian churches in Utah
Churches on the National Register of Historic Places in Utah
Churches completed in 1906
1906 establishments in Utah
National Register of Historic Places in Emery County, Utah